HNF1 homeobox B (hepatocyte nuclear factor 1 homeobox B), also known as HNF1B or transcription factor 2 (TCF2), is a human gene.

Function 

HNF1B encodes hepatocyte nuclear factor 1-beta, a protein of the homeobox-containing basic helix-turn-helix family. The HNF1B protein is believed to form heterodimers with another member of this transcription factor family, HNF1A; depending on the HNF1B isoform, the result may be to activate or inhibit transcription of target genes. Deficiency of HNF1B cause abnormal maternal-Zygote transition and early embryogenesis failure. Mutation of HNF1B that disrupts normal function has been identified as the cause of MODY 5 (Maturity-Onset of Diabetes, Type 5). A third human transcript variant is believed to exist based on such a variant in the rat: however, to date such an mRNA species has not been isolated.

See also 
 Hepatocyte nuclear factors

References

Further reading

External links 
 

Transcription factors